The canton of Meximieux is an administrative division in eastern France. At the French canton reorganisation which came into effect in March 2015, the canton was expanded from 12 to 15 communes:
 
Balan
Béligneux
Bourg-Saint-Christophe
Bressolles
Dagneux
Faramans
Joyeux
Meximieux
Le Montellier
Montluel
Pérouges
Pizay
Rignieux-le-Franc
Sainte-Croix
Saint-Éloi

Demographics

See also
Cantons of the Ain department 
Communes of France

References

Cantons of Ain